State Highway 79 (SH 79) is a New Zealand state highway connecting the South Canterbury communities of Rangitata, Geraldine, and Fairlie. Starting at State Highway 1 the highway is 61 kilometres in length and runs in a general east–west direction. 6.3 km of the highway through Geraldine runs concurrently with the Inland Scenic Route, formerly State Highway 72. The road is a two-lane single carriageway, with a one-lane bridge crossing the Orari River.

It is an important tourist highway, and forms part of the most direct route between Christchurch and the Mackenzie Country, Aoraki / Mount Cook and Queenstown/Wanaka.

Route 
 The highway starts on the Canterbury Plains and proceeds in a north-westerly direction. The highway then intersects with the Inland Scenic Route and crosses the Orari River. The highway then veers to the south and arrives in Geraldine. In the town centre, SH 79 turns right and passes through the southern sections of the township before veering to the west towards the foothills. The road gradually passes through sections of pine forest and farmlands and is generally hilly and curvy in some spots before descending into the township of Fairlie.

Major intersections

See also
List of New Zealand state highways

References

External links
 New Zealand Transport Agency

Geography of Canterbury, New Zealand
79
Transport in Canterbury, New Zealand